Enrique Miret Magdalena (12 January 1914 – 12 October 2009) was a lay theologian who specialised in ethics and sociology. He was professor of Ethics at Universidad Complutense de Madrid.

He published some 25 books and wrote for the journal Triunfo for 20 years, as well as for other publications.

References

1914 births
2009 deaths
Spanish Christian theologians
Spanish male writers
Spanish ethicists
Spanish philosophers
20th-century Spanish philosophers
20th-century Spanish journalists